Larry Loupolover (born April 8, 1999) is an American figure skater who currently represents Bulgaria in men's singles and formerly represented Azerbaijan. He has won four senior international medals and qualified to the free skate at two European Championships (2015, 2020).

Programs

Competitive highlights 
CS: Challenger Series; JGP: Junior Grand Prix

For Bulgaria

For Azerbaijan

References

External links 
 

1999 births
Azerbaijani male single skaters
Living people
People from Brooklyn
Competitors at the 2023 Winter World University Games